Jean-Pierre Marielle (12 April 1932 – 24 April 2019) was a French actor. He appeared in more than a hundred films in which he played very diverse roles, from a banal citizen (Les Galettes de Pont-Aven), to a World War II hero (Les Milles), to a compromised spy, to a has-been actor (Les Grands Ducs), to his portrayal of Jacques Saunière in The Da Vinci Code. He was well known for his distinctive cavernous voice, which is often imitated by French humorists who considered him to be  archetypical of the French gentleman.

Early life
Marielle was born in 1932 in Paris to an industrialist father and a dressmaker mother. His first acting experiences dated back to his high school years during which he staged some of Chekhov’s plays with his comrades. He initially wanted to study literature but one of his teachers encouraged him to become an actor instead, so that he joined the Conservatoire National where he became close friends with Jean-Paul Belmondo and Jean Rochefort and from where he left with the comedy second prize in 1954.

Career
Marielle's early career consisted of stage roles with the Grenier-Hussenot company, notably in Harold Pinter’s plays, and some small appearances on the large screen by the late 1950s, with his particular voice giving him the abilities to play older characters. However, disappointed by his first movie roles, he turned to cabaret for a certain time.

He obtained a little more consistent roles in the 1960s in movies such as Faites sauter la banque! (1963), starring alongside Louis de Funès, Weekend at Dunkirk (1964) and in particular Un monsieur de compagnie (1965), where French director Philippe de Broca gave him the opportunity to express all of his talent. But his popularity really exploded during the 1970s as he appeared in a lot of comedies. In  (1974) he played an Israeli spy having to hide in a trunk in order to be extracted from a country in the Middle East. Les Galettes de Pont-Aven  (1975), Que la fête commence (1974) and Coup de Torchon (1981) confirmed him as a great actor.

The other major role of his career was Monsieur de Sainte-Colombe in Tous les matins du monde (1994).

In parallel he made a brilliant stage career and received the highest French award for a theater actor, the Molière, in 1994. He played Jacques Sauniere in The Da Vinci Code (2006). He was awarded the Légion d’Honneur in 1992.

Personal life
Marielle was married to French actress Agathe Natanson from 4 October 2003 until his death and had a son from a previous union. He was a great fan of jazz music and New York City.

Marielle died on April 24, 2019 at the age of 87.

Awards
 1995 : Golden Goblet Award for Best Actor (2nd Shanghai International Film Festival) for the film Les Milles.
 1992 : 7 d'Or Award for Best Actor for the TV film .
 1987 : Mystfest Award for Best Actor for the film .
 2008 : Honorary Lumières Award (13th Lumières Awards)

Nominations
 2004 – César Award for Best Actor in a Supporting Role for the film La Petite Lili.
 1993 – César Award for Best Actor in a Supporting Role for the film Max et Jérémie.
 1992 – César Award for Best Actor for the film Tous les matins du monde.
 1989 – César Award for Best Actor in a Supporting Role for the film Quelques jours avec moi.
 1982 – César Award for Best Actor in a Supporting Role for the film Coup de Torchon.
 1976 – César Award for Best Actor for the film Les Galettes de Pont-Aven.

Filmography

References

External links

 

1932 births
2019 deaths
French male film actors
French male television actors
Actors from Dijon
French National Academy of Dramatic Arts alumni
20th-century French male actors
21st-century French male actors
French male stage actors
Officiers of the Légion d'honneur